The 1972 Western Championships, also known as the Cincinnati Open, was a combined men's and women's tennis tournament played on outdoor clay courts at the Queen City Racquet Club in the Sharonville suburb of Cincinnati, Ohio in the United States that was part of the 1972 Commercial Union Assurance Grand Prix. It was the 72nd edition of the tournament and was held from July 31 through August 6, 1972.  Jimmy Connors and Margaret Court won the singles titles.

Finals

Men's singles
 Jimmy Connors defeated  Guillermo Vilas 6–3, 6–3
 It was Connors' 5th singles title of the year and of his career.

Women's singles
 Margaret Court defeated  Evonne Goolagong 3–6, 6–2, 7–5

Men's doubles
 Bob Hewitt /  Frew McMillan defeated  Paul Gerken /  Humphrey Hose 7–6, 6–4

Women's doubles
 Margaret Court /  Evonne Goolagong defeated  Brenda Kirk /  Pat Walkden-Pretorius 6–4, 6–1

References

External links
 
 ATP tournament profile
 ITF tournament edition profile

Cincinnati Open
Cincinnati Masters
Cincinnati Open
Cincinnati Open
Cincinnati Open
Cincinnati Open